These are the results for the boys' 3m springboard event at the 2018 Summer Youth Olympics.

Results

References

External links
 Preliminary results 
 Final results 

Diving at the 2018 Summer Youth Olympics